Meghauli (Nepali) is a village and former Village Development Committee that is now part of Bharatpur Metropolitan City in Bagmati Province of central Nepal.

In December 2014, Meghauli among neighboring other Village Development Committees was merged to form Narayani Municipality. In 2016 Narayani Municipality was itself merged into Bharatpur  creating the metropolitan city of Bharatpur. The former Meghauli V.D.C. looks after civic affairs in the town. The municipal area is divided into two wards of Bharatpur Metropolitan City, Ward No. 27 & 28.

At the time of the 1991 Nepal census it had a population of 12,281 people living in 2027 individual households.

Meghauli village touches over 25 km of the borders of the park and is situated on the banks of the Rapti and Narayani River. Situated at 172 km from Kathmandu, Meghauli is in the western part of Chitwan district. Meghauli is one of the richest villages in Chitwan in terms of wildlife, different cultures and sports is located in the adjacent of Chitwan National Park.

Places of interest

Meghauli is the western entrance of the Chitwan National Park that attracts thousands of visitors every year to explore its rich flora and fauna. The huge 25 km long community forest is another eye catching object of Meghauli.

The new concept had been materialized for the tourism development in Meghauli. National park entrance gate, elephant stable, view tower, eco park. National crocodile dreediy pond and medicinal herbal farming in the buffer zone are the main attractions in the Meghauli.

It is also a very interesting place to learn about the local indigenous Tharu people as the village is a very well preserve example of a traditional settlement and now is possible to stay at one of the 5 Tharu Homestays.

Apart from these, Meghauli has excellent potential for the establishment of resorts and hotels. Rhino Resort, Golaghat Wildlife Resort, Barahi Resort, Chital lodge, Chautari lodge, Ecopark Volunteering and restaurant etc. are serving to some extent who come to visit Megauli.

Rafters, after a trip end at the Golaghat, the confluence of Narayani and Rapti River, can see the sunset and a view of the Himalayas. Meghauli has a good balance between human settlement and wildlife.

There is bird watching for Bengal florican, giant horn bill, lesser florican, black stork and white stork. One can also see one horned rhinos, royal Bengal tiger, chital, hog deer, barking deer, sloth bear, palm civet, langur monkey and the gharial crocodile along with many other common species such as gaur, elephant, hyena, pangolin, Gangetic dolphin, monitor lizard, and striped python. The village has a wide area for sporting activities. Every year sports like para jumping and elephant polo are held in Meghauli. One can also see the local Tharu stick dance, tiger dance and mask dance ghost dance which are popular in this village.

Narayani River
Narayani River flows north of Meghauli. Narayani river is the deepest and also one of the biggest rivers of Nepal. Eastern side of the Narayani river bank in Meghauli is regarded as the holy site for Hindu rituals.

Rapti River
Rapti River flows South of Meghauli and bank of the Chitwan National Park.
confluence of Narayani and Rapti River at Golaghat

Narayangarh 
Narayangarh in Bharatpur city, is the main shopping and commercial area for Meghauli residents. Is the main transit point for all the vehicles traveling via east-west Mahendra Highway and also for the people traveling from  Kathmandu, Gorkha, and Pokhara  through Mugling road.

Recently, Narayangarh has become a retail and commercial capital of whole Chitwan district and Bharatpur Metropolitan City. It is also the center for hospitality industry which includes Hotels, Lodges, Restaurants etc. and transportation hub for Chitwan district.

Transportation 

It is the gateway airport to Chitwan National Park, and sees thousands of tourists annually. Permits for Foreign tourists intending to journey to Chitwan are issued at this airport.

Mahendra East West Highway connects from the Chaubiskothi Bharatpur, Bus, micro bus and other land transportation are available to go out of the Meghauli,. Parsadhap Bazaar, EcoPark, Telauli Bazaar, Meghauli Bazaar, Sajhapur, Jitpur Bazaar,  Bhagaha and Golaghat are major centres at intersections of major roads.

Agriculture 
The people inhabiting the Meghauli are predominantly peasant farmers cultivating mainly food and cash crops such as rice, maize, wheat, beans, lentils, mustard and vegetables. The poultry industry in the village constitutes a significant proportion of the district's poultry industry.

Educational institutions
Milly Jully Higher Secondary Boarding School, Parsadhap
Paramount English Boarding School, Parsadhap
Shree Kajiman Lower Secondary School, Parsadhap
Bright Future English Secondary School, TelauliShree Janaki Higher Secondary School, MeghauliShree Rastriya Prathamik Bidhyalaya, DharampurNamuna English Boarding School, GautamnagarShree Sajhapur Higher Secondary School, Sajhapur Shree Saraswati Higher Secondary School, JitpurAlimighty Academy, JitpurShree Rastriya Prathamik Bidhyalaya, AndrauliShree Rastriya Prathamik Bidhyalaya, Golaghat*Shree Rastriya Prathamik Bidhyalaya, Sishabass'''

Religion

The overwhelming majority of the Meghauli population follows Hinduism or Buddhism. There are also significant numbers of Christians, Muslims.

References

Populated places in Chitwan District
Village development committees (Nepal)
Tourism in Nepal